The 2017 Meridian Canadian Open was held from January 3 to 8 at the North Battleford Civic Centre in North Battleford, Saskatchewan. This was the fourth Grand Slam of Curling event and third "major" of the 2016–17 curling season.

On the men's side, Newfoundland's Brad Gushue rink played in their fourth straight Canadian Open final, defeating the Niklas Edin team from Sweden, who were hoping to win their third Slam of the season. It was Gushue's seventh career Grand Slam. Gushue played a perfect game, curling 100% en route to defeating Edin 8-3.

On the women's side, the little-known Casey Scheidegger rink from Lethbridge, Alberta won their first Grand Slam title in their first ever Grand Slam event (excluding defunct events, which are not counted in media reports). They defeated the Silvana Tirinzoni rink from Switzerland who lost their second straight Slam final.

Men

Teams

Knockout Draw Brackets

A Event

B Event

C Event

Playoffs

Quarterfinals
Saturday, January 7, 12:00 pm

Semifinals
Saturday, January 7, 8:00 pm

Final
Sunday, January 8, 11:00 am

Women

Teams

Knockout Draw Brackets

A Event

B Event

C Event

Playoffs

Quarterfinals
Saturday, January 7, 4:00 pm

Semifinals
Saturday, January 7, 8:00 pm

Final
Sunday, January 8, 3:00 pm

References

External links

2017
January 2017 sports events in Canada
2017 in Canadian curling
North Battleford
Curling in Saskatchewan